Empis impennis  is a species of fly in the family Empididae. It is included in the subgenus Coptophlebia of the genus Empis. It is found in the  Palearctic.

References

Empis
Taxa named by Gabriel Strobl
Insects described in 1902
Asilomorph flies of Europe